Joseph Franklin may refer to:

Joe Franklin (1926–2015), stage name of Joseph Fortgang, American radio talk-show host
Joseph John Franklin (1870–1940), American Medal of Honor recipient
Joseph Paul Franklin (1950–2013), American serial killer
Joseph Franklin (composer), American composer
Joe L. Franklin (1906–1982), professor of chemistry

See also